Dingpu is a railway station of Taiwan Railways Administration (TRA) Yilan line located at Toucheng Township, Yilan County, Taiwan. Dingpu Station began operations in 1937.

History
The station was opened on 1 May 1937.

See also
 List of railway stations in Taiwan

References

1937 establishments in Taiwan
Railway stations in Yilan County, Taiwan
Railway stations opened in 1937
Railway stations served by Taiwan Railways Administration